Common names: San Lorenzo Island rattlesnake.

Crotalus lorenzoensis is a species of pitviper, a venomous snake in the subfamily Crotalinae of the family Viperidae. The species is endemic to San Lorenzo Sur Island, Mexico.

Description
Crotalus lorenzoensis usually has no rattle, and has shrunk in size compared to its counterparts on the mainland.

Geographic range
Crotalus lorenzoensis is known only from the type locality, which is "San Lorenzo Sur Island in the Gulf of California, Baja California Norte, Mexico".

Habitat
Crotalus lorenzoensis occurs mainly in rocky areas and arroyo bottoms. It can also be found in dunes near the coast and in cavities formed by adjacent boulders.

Conservation status
The species C. lorenzoensis is classified as "Least Concern" (LC) on the IUCN Red List of Threatened Species. Species are listed as such due to their wide distribution, presumed large population, or because it is unlikely to be declining fast enough to qualify for listing in a more threatened category.

References

Further reading
Heimes, Peter (2016). Snakes of Mexico: Herpetofauna Mexicana Vol I. Frankfurt, Germany: Chimaira. 572 pp. .
Radcliffe, C.W., and T. Paul Maslin (1975). "A New Subspecies of the Red Rattlesnake, Crotalus ruber, from San Lorenzo Sur Island, Baja California Norte, Mexico". Copeia 1975 (3): 490-493. (Crotalus ruber lorenzoensis, new subspecies).

External links

lorenzoensis
Endemic reptiles of Mexico
Endemic fauna of the Baja California Peninsula
Fauna of Gulf of California islands